Temples in Japan.

temples
 Saihō-ji (Kyoto) - Rinzai-shū - World Heritage Site

temples
 Saihō-ji (Tokiwadeguchi-chō, Ukyō-ku, Kyoto) - Jōdokyō
 Saihō-ji (Nishikyōgokukitaura-chō, Ukyō-ku, Kyoto)
 Saihō-ji (Gōno-chō, Shimogyō-ku, Kyoto)
 Saihō-ji (Shijo Ōmiya-chō, Shimogyō-ku, Kyoto)
 Saihō-ji (Daigo Nakayama-chō, Fushimi-ku, Kyoto)
 Saihō-ji (Hazukashi Furukawa-chō, Fushimi-ku, Kyoto)
 Saihō-ji (Furoya-machi, Fushimi-ku, Kyoto)
 Saihō-ji (Kita-ku, Kyoto)
 Saihō-ji (Nara)
 Saihō-ji (Sendai)
 Saihō-ji (Kiryu)
 Saihō-ji (Takaoka)
 Saihō-ji (Nagano)
 Saihō-ji (Hekinan)
 Saihō-ji (Kurume)
 Saihō-ji (Sasebo)
 Saihō-ji (Gotō)
 Saihō-ji (Kanoya)
 Saihō-ji (Satsumasendai)
 Saihō-ji (Tokyo)
 Saihō-ji (Kashiwa)
 Saihō-ji (Takehara)